Şabanköy is a village in the Bingöl District, Bingöl Province, Turkey. The village is populated by Kurds of the Reman tribe and had a population of 276 in 2021.

References 

Villages in Bingöl District
Kurdish settlements in Bingöl Province